Autosnelweg (plural: autosnelwegen) is the Dutch term for motorway or freeway. It is both used in the Netherlands and Belgium, and so it may refer to:
list of motorways in the Netherlands.
list of motorways in Belgium.